Group A of the 2000 Fed Cup Europe/Africa Zone Group II was one of four pools in the Europe/Africa zone of the 2000 Fed Cup. Five teams competed in a round robin competition, with the top team advancing to Group I for 2001.

Macedonia vs. Mauritius

Ireland vs. Malta

Macedonia vs. Malta

Ireland vs. Kenya

Ireland vs. Mauritius

Malta vs. Kenya

Macedonia vs. Kenya

Malta vs. Mauritius

Macedonia vs. Ireland

Mauritius vs. Kenya

  placed first in this group and thus advanced to Group I for 2001, where they placed last in their pool of four, and was thus relegated back to Group II for 2002.

See also
Fed Cup structure

References

External links
 Fed Cup website

2000 Fed Cup Europe/Africa Zone